Libera is an all-boy English vocal group directed by Robert Prizeman. Their discography consists of 13 studio albums, three live albums, ten compilation albums, three video albums, an extended play, and six singles. Their early works were released under the names St. Philip's Choir and Angel Voices.

Albums

Studio albums

As St. Philip's Choir / Angel Voices

As Libera

Live albums

Compilation albums

As Libera

As St. Philip's Choir / Angel Voices

EPs

Video albums

Singles

Other charted songs

References

Discographies of British artists